The 1980 All-SEC football team consists of American football players selected to the All-Southeastern Conference (SEC) chosen by various selectors for the 1980 NCAA Division I-A football season.

Offensive selections

Receivers 

 Cris Collinsworth, Florida (AP, UPI)
Mardye McDole, Miss. St. (AP, UPI)

Tight ends

Chris Faulkner, Florida (AP, UPI)

Tackles 
Tim Irwin, Tennessee (AP, UPI)
Alan Massey, Miss. St. (AP)

Guards
Tim Morrison, Georgia (AP, UPI [as T])
Wayne Harris, Miss. St. (AP)
George Stephenson, Auburn (UPI)
Nat Hudson, Georgia (UPI)

Centers 
Ken Roark, Kentucky (AP)
Lee North, Tennessee (UPI)

Quarterbacks 

 Buck Belue, Georgia (AP)
 John Fourcade, Ole Miss (UPI)

Running backs 

 Herschel Walker, Georgia (College Football Hall of Fame) (AP, UPI)
James Brooks, Auburn (AP, UPI)

Defensive selections

Ends 
E. J. Junior, Alabama (AP, UPI)
Lyman White, LSU (AP, UPI)

Tackles 
Frank Warren, Auburn (AP)
Eddie Weaver, Georgia (AP)
Byron Braggs, Alabama (UPI)
Jimmy Payne, Georgia (UPI)

Middle guards
Jim Noonan, Tennessee (AP, UPI)

Linebackers 
Johnie Cooks, Miss. St. (AP, UPI)
 David Little, Florida (AP, UPI)
 Tom Boyd, Alabama (AP, UPI)

Backs 
Scott Woerner, Georgia (AP, UPI)
Jeff Hipp, Georgia (AP, UPI)
Chris Williams, LSU (AP)
Tommy Wilcox, Alabama (AP)
Jim Bob Harris, Alabama (UPI)

Special teams

Kicker 
Rex Robinson, Georgia (AP, UPI)

Punter 

 Jim Arnold, Vanderbilt (AP, UPI)

Key
AP = Associated Press

UPI = United Press International

Bold = Consensus first-team selection by both AP and UPI

See also
1980 College Football All-America Team

References

All-SEC
All-SEC football teams